The coat of arms of Hungary was adopted on 3 July 1990, after the end of communist rule. The arms have been used before, both with and without the Holy Crown of Hungary, sometimes as part of a larger, more complex coat of arms, and its elements date back to the Middle Ages.

The shield is split into two parts:
 The dexter (the right side from the bearer's perspective, the left side from the viewer's) features the so-called Árpád stripes, four Gules (red) and four Argent (silver) stripes. Traditionally, the silver stripes represent four rivers: Duna (Danube), Tisza, Dráva, and Száva.
 The sinister (the left side from the bearer's perspective, the right side from the viewer's) consists of an Argent (silver) double cross on Gules (red) base, situated inside a small Or (golden) crown, the crown is placed on the middle heap of three Vert (green) hills, representing the mountain ranges (trimount) Tátra, Mátra, and Fátra.

Atop the shield rests the Holy Crown of St. Stephen (Stephen I of Hungary, István király), a crown that remains in the Parliament building (Országház) in Budapest today.

History

Kingdom of Hungary
The most common motifs of the ninth and the early tenth centuries -the griffin, wolf and hind- seldom figure in later Hungarian iconography and heraldic symbolism, however the Hawk or Turul which in shamanistic lore rested upon the tree of life connecting the earth with the netherworld and the skies preserved for longer as a device belonging to the ruling house.

Changes during the 20th Century

Honours
 In May and June 1946 a set of eight stamps of Coat of arms of Hungary was issued. These are the issues of inflation.
 Further, a fourteen-stamp set of Arms and Post-horn were issued May and June 1946; these are also the issues of inflation.
 Four commemorative stamps were issued on 15 March 1948 as part of the series: Centenary of the beginning of Hungary’s war for Independence.
 In 20 August 1949 three stamps of Arms of Hungary were issued on the occasion of the Adoption of the Hungarian Peoples’ Republic’s Constitution.
 On 23 May 1958 three stamps were issued to commemorate the first anniversary of the law amending the constitution.  
 Between 1941–45 as many as 44 Postage-Due stamps of various denominations, watermarks and paper were issued.
Some other stamps were also issued.

See also

 Coat of arms of Budapest
 Hungarian heraldry

References
Bálint Hóman: A magyar címer történetéhez ("Additions to the history of the coat of arms of Hungary"), 1920  (Hungarian)
Iván Bertényi: Államcímerünk kialakulása ("Emergence of the state coat of arms"), 2003  (Hungarian)
József Laszlovszky: A magyar címer története ("History of the Hungarian coat of arms"), Egyetemi Nyomda, Budapest, 1989, p. 39

 
13. colnect.com/en/stamps/list/country/6955-Hungary/year/1958/page/4. Mi:HU 1529A-32A, Sn:HU 1191–93, Yt:HU 1245–47.
14. colnect.com/en/stamps/list/country/6955-Hungary/year/1941/page/4,5. colnect.com/en/stamps/list/country/6955-Hungary/year/1942/page/4. colnect.com/en/stamps/list/country/6955-Hungary/year/1944/page/2,3.
colnect.com/en/stamps/list/country/6955-Hungary/year/1945/page/10,11,12.

External links 
 The Hungarian Coat of Arms
 History of the Coat of Arms of Hungary from Szeged University (in Hungarian, with pictures)
 Hungarian Coat of Arms (in French, with pictures)
 2011 CCII law (on the use of Hungary's coat of arms and flag, as well as awards) from njt.hu

Hungarian coats of arms
Hungary
National symbols of Hungary
Hungary
Hungary
Hungary
Hungary